Richard Cornelius Frydenlund (1 May 1891 – 20 January 1981) was a Norwegian wrestler.

He competed at the 1912 Summer Olympics, and at the 1920 Summer Olympics in Antwerp where he placed fifth in Greco-Roman lightweight. He was a brother of Thorbjørn Frydenlund, and both represented the club IF Ørnulf.

References

External links
 

1891 births
1981 deaths
Sportspeople from Oslo
Olympic wrestlers of Norway
Wrestlers at the 1912 Summer Olympics
Wrestlers at the 1920 Summer Olympics
Norwegian male sport wrestlers
19th-century Norwegian people
20th-century Norwegian people